In mathematics, a Malcev Lie algebra, or Mal'tsev Lie algebra, is a generalization of a rational nilpotent Lie algebra, and Malcev groups are similar.

Definition

According to  a Malcev Lie algebra is a rational Lie algebra  together with a complete, descending -vector space filtration , such that:

 
 
 the associated graded Lie algebra  is generated by elements of degree one.

Applications

Relation to Hopf algebras
The functors involved in these equivalences are as follows: a Malcev group G is mapped to the completion (with respect to the augmentation ideal) of its group ring QG, with inverse given by the group of grouplike elements of a Hopf algebra H, essentially those elements 1 + x such that . From complete Hopf algebras to Malcev Lie algebras one gets by taking the (completion of) primitive elements, with inverse functor given by the completion of the universal enveloping algebra.

This theorem was a pioneering result in the area of trace methods.

Hodge theory
Malcev Lie algebras also arise in the theory of mixed Hodge structures.

References
 

Hodge theory
Lie algebras